Ochralea is a genus of leaf beetles in the subfamily Galerucinae. It is distributed in the Oriental realm. The genus was formerly considered a synonym of Monolepta, until it was resurrected by Hazmi and Wagner in 2010, but the name is a permanently unavailable junior homonym of Ochralea Chevrolat, 1836 and will need to be replaced.

Species
The genus includes two species:
 Ochralea nigripes (Olivier, 1808)
 Ochralea wangkliana (Mohamedsaid, 2005)

References

Galerucinae
Chrysomelidae genera